"Tian Mi Mi" (literally "very sweet") is a 1979 Mandarin Chinese song by Teresa Teng. The lyrics were written by Zhuang Nu. The music was adapted from a 1940s gambang kromong about sampan boats called "Dayung Sampan" by the pasindhèn Dasimah.

The film Tian mi mi (Comrades: Almost a Love Story) is named after and features the Teresa Teng song.

Recording and versions
In 1978, while on tour in Southeast Asia, Teng produced an Indonesian-language cover of "Dayung Sampan", a popular song in Indonesia and Singapore. In 1979, she was arrested in Japan and deported to British Hong Kong for using an Indonesian passport, which Japan found had been obtained from the Indonesian embassy in Hong Kong under suspicious circumstances. Fearing punishment in Taiwan, which was under an autocratic government at the time, for using an Indonesian passport, unable to return to Japan, and unable to stay permanently in Hong Kong, she went to the United States and became a student at the University of Southern California. To fulfill her contractual obligation, she composed a Chinese cover of "Dayung Sampan" while studying, which became Tian mi mi. Zhuang Nu (莊奴, 1922–2016), a Taiwanese songwriter, wrote the lyrics in roughly five minutes after being told he was writing for Teresa Teng.

Although the song is indelibly associated with Teresa Teng, it has been recorded by many artists.

Luhan version

Chinese singer and actor Luhan recorded the song for the soundtrack of the 2015 mainland Chinese release of the 1996 film Comrades: Almost a Love Story. In January 2015, it was announced that Luhan would be singing the theme song for the film's release in China, according to Chinese media outlet Sina. The movie, directed by Hong Kong filmmaker Peter Chan, was originally released in 1996. Due to the political tension between Hong Kong and mainland China, however, it took 19 years for the film to be approved for release in China. A member of the production team explained, "Peter Chan asked [Chinese musician] Dou Feng to arrange for the recording of a new version of the theme song, and requested that Luhan sing for the film's soundtrack." Director Peter Chan is said to have asked Luhan to participate due to his gentle and clear voice, as he felt it would be effective in expressing the emotions of the song. The song was officially released on 3 February 2015.

A teaser video was released on 2 February 2015. The music video was released two days later.

References

1979 songs
Teresa Teng songs
Mandarin-language songs